Septober Energy is the only album of the jazz/progressive rock big band Centipede. Produced by Robert Fripp under the musical direction of Keith Tippett, it was originally released 1971 in the UK as a double LP, and 1974 in the US with a different cover. The album was recorded at Wessex Studios, London during three days in June 1971. The album is a four-part suite consisting of four tracks of about 20 minutes each.

A remastered CD release (from the original master tapes), using the USA cover, was released in 2000 by BGO. All previous authorized CD releases (on the What Next? and Disconforme labels) were mastered from vinyl sources.

Septober Energy - Part 4 is based on the instrumental track Green and Orange Night Park that was part of The Keith Tippett Group's 1970 album Dedicated To You, But You Weren't Listening.

Another version, titled Septober Energy and including vocals, can be found on the album The Bristol Concert by Mujician and The Georgian Ensemble, recorded 1991.

Sleeve notes
Writing in the sleeve notes, Robert Wyatt said:
 
"Of course I can't tell you anything about this music, because that would be silly, and I can't examine publicly Keith's murky motives for dreaming up this insane travelling circus known as 'Centipede'. If I were to talk about how Fripp coped with the unprecedented production problems in such a short space of time, I'd be wasting yours, because the job's done now and I never really understood the technical details anyway. Should I try to explain Julie's lyrics? Of course not! ... I shall, however, leave you with a brief, but important message from Nick Evans: "Wah-Hay"."

Track listing

Disc 1
"Septober Energy - Part 1" – 21:43
"Septober Energy - Part 2" – 23:34

Disc 2
"Septober Energy - Part 3" – 21:21
"Septober Energy - Part 4" – 18:45

Personnel

Violins

Wendy Treacher
John Trussler
Roddy Skeaping
Wilf Gibson (lead)
Carol Slater
Louise Jopling
Garth Morton
Channa Salononson
Steve Rowlandson
Mica Gomberti
Colin Kitching
Philip Saudek
Esther Burgi

Cellos

Michael Hurwitz
Timothy Kramer
Suki Towb
John Rees-Jones
Katherine Thulborn
Catherine Finnis

Trumpets

Peter Parkes
Mick Collins
Ian Carr (doubling flugelhorn)
Mongezi Feza (pocket cornet)
Mark Charig (cornet)

Alto saxes

Elton Dean (doubling saxello)
Jan Steele (doubling flute)
Ian McDonald
Dudu Pukwana

Tenor saxes

Larry Stabbins
Gary Windo
Brian Smith
Alan Skidmore

Baritone saxes

Dave White (doubling clarinet)
Karl Jenkins (doubling oboe)
John Williams (bass saxophone, doubling soprano)

Trombones

Nick Evans
Dave Amis
Dave Perrottet
Paul Rutherford

Drums

John Marshall (and all percussion)
Tony Fennell
Robert Wyatt

Vocalists

Maggie Nicols
Julie Tippetts
Mike Patto
Zoot Money
Boz Burrell

Basses

Roy Babbington (doubling bass guitar)
Gill Lyons
Harry Miller
Jeff Clyne
Dave Markee
Brian Belshaw

Guitars

Brian Godding

Piano

Keith Tippett - musical director

Technical credits

Robert Fripp - producer
Mike Thompson - engineer
Dick Whitehead - album design (US release)
Martin Adelman - cover photograph (US release)

Band members not on the recording: Robert Fripp (guitar) and Paul Nieman (trombone)

References

External links
Septober Energy reviews at www.progarchives.com

1971 debut albums
Experimental big band albums
Albums produced by Robert Fripp
Centipede (band) albums